Julius Falkenstein (25 February 1879 – 9 December 1933) was a German stage and film actor of the silent era. He appeared in more than 180 films between 1914 and 1933. Falkenstein was Jewish, but secured a special permit to continue making films following the Nazi rise to power in 1933. He died of natural causes the same year, having made only one further film.

Selected filmography

 Die geheimnisvolle Villa (1914)
 The Princess of Neutralia (1917)
The Toboggan Cavalier (1918)
 The Oyster Princess (1919)
 The Dancer Barberina (1920)
 The Love of a Thief (1920)
 The Princess of the Nile (1920)
 Romeo and Juliet in the Snow (1920)
 The Haunted Castle (1921)
 The Story of Christine von Herre (1921)
 The Convict of Cayenne (1921)
 Lola Montez, the King's Dancer (1922)
 Dr. Mabuse the Gambler (1922)
 His Excellency from Madagascar (1922)
 Don Juan (1922)
 Das Milliardensouper (1923)
 Earth Spirit (1923)
 The Doll Maker of Kiang-Ning (1923)
 The Weather Station (1923)
 The Grand Duke's Finances (1924)
 In the Name of the King (1924)
 Neptune Bewitched (1925)
 Women of Luxury (1925)
 A Waltz Dream (1925)
 The Brothers Schellenberg (1926)
 Department Store Princess (1926)
 Countess Ironing-Maid (1926)
 The Blue Danube (1926)
 Young Blood (1926)
 Circus Romanelli (1926)
 Annemarie and Her Cavalryman (1926)
 Vienna, How it Cries and Laughs (1926)
  The Pride of the Company (1926)
 The Armoured Vault (1926)
 We'll Meet Again in the Heimat (1926)
 Sword and Shield (1926)
 We Belong to the Imperial-Royal Infantry Regiment (1926)
 The Master of Nuremberg (1927)
 Break-in (1927)
 Linden Lady on the Rhine (1927)
 Excluded from the Public (1927)
 Night of Mystery (1927)
 That Was Heidelberg on Summer Nights (1927)
 The Convicted (1927)
 His Late Excellency (1927)
 Hello Caesar! (1927)
 The Indiscreet Woman (1927)
 Light-Hearted Isabel (1927)
 Dancing Vienna (1927)
 The Page Boy at the Golden Lion (1928)
 Spies (1928)
 The Blue Mouse (1928)
 Secrets of the Orient (1928)
 You Walk So Softly (1928)
 Her Dark Secret (1929)
 The Night Belongs to Us (1929)
 Somnambul (1929)
 The Lord of the Tax Office (1929)
 Taxi at Midnight (1929)
 Beware of Loose Women (1929)
 Distinguishing Features (1929)
  The Customs Judge (1929)
 Lux, King of Criminals (1929)
 Sinful and Sweet (1929)
 Daughter of the Regiment (1929)
 The Model from Montparnasse (1929)
 What a Woman Dreams of in Springtime (1929)
 Tragedy of Youth (1929)
 Only on the Rhine (1930)
  The Man in the Dark (1930)
 It Happens Every Day (1930)
 The Woman Without Nerves (1930)
 Marriage Strike (1930)
  Fire in the Opera House (1930)
 Mischievous Miss (1930)
 The Immortal Vagabond (1930)
 Fairground People (1930)
 Love in the Ring (1930)
 The Other (1930)
 End of the Rainbow (1930)
 Road to Rio (1931)
 Der Kongreß tanzt (1931)
 Shooting Festival in Schilda (1931)
  The True Jacob (1931)
 The Adventurer of Tunis (1931)
 A Crafty Youth (1931)
 Berlin-Alexanderplatz (1931)
  Grock (1931)
 That's All That Matters (1931)
 Weekend in Paradise (1931)
 The Firm Gets Married (1931)
 No More Love (1931)
 A Waltz by Strauss (1931)
 Queen of the Night (1931)
 Inquest (1931)
 Victoria and Her Hussar (1931)
 Night Convoy (1932)
 Crime Reporter Holm (1932)
  Holzapfel Knows Everything (1932)
 Two Heavenly Blue Eyes (1932)
 Overnight Sensation (1932)
 Impossible Love (1932)
 The Magic Top Hat (1932)
 The Importance of Being Earnest (1932)
 The Song of Night (1932)
 Chauffeur Antoinette (1932)
 Distorting at the Resort (1932)
 I by Day, You by Night (1932)
 Storms of Passion (1932)
 The Testament of Cornelius Gulden (1932)
 Gypsies of the Night (1932)
 You Don't Forget Such a Girl (1932)
 Man Without a Name (1932)
 The Victor (1932)
 The Beautiful Adventure (1932)
 Marion, That's Not Nice (1933)
  A Woman Like You (1933)
 The Only Girl (1933)
 Laughing Heirs (1933)
 Spies at Work (1933)
 The Sandwich Girl (1933)
 The Empress and I (1933)
 The Roberts Case (1933)
 A Song for You (1933)
 The Flower Girl from the Grand Hotel (1934)

References

External links

1879 births
1933 deaths
20th-century German male actors
Male actors from Berlin
German male stage actors
German male film actors
German male silent film actors
19th-century German Jews
Jewish German male actors